Primary physical custody is a term that is often used in child custody orders to denote the parent with whom a child spends or lives the majority of the time with.  It is a term that is often used in cases where one parent has more time with his/her child than the other.  

Traditionally Courts have favored children having an exclusive home in order to encourage stability in children's lives. Fathers regularly report a perception that mothers are favored when deciding physical custody of infants. This may be in part because sexist laws have been passed in states that younger children (of tender years) should be with their mother until a certain age of maturity. Research by Joan B. Kelly, Ph.D., and Michael E. Lamb, Ph.D. have challenged this philosophy in recent years.

External links
http://www.deltabravo.net/custody/overnights.php

Child custody